Khar-Khar is a populated place in the southern Lower Juba (Jubbada Hoose) region of Somalia.

References

Populated places in Lower Juba